Seth Robert Casiple (born August 23, 1993) is an American soccer player who currently plays for Orange County SC in the USL Championship.

Career

College and amateur
Casiple spent his entire college career at the University of California, Berkeley. He made a total of 74 appearances for the Golden Bears and tallied six goals and 27 assists.

He also played in the Premier Development League for Austin Aztex and San Jose Earthquakes U23.

Professional
On January 20, 2015, Casiple was the last player taken in the 2015 MLS SuperDraft.  He was selected by the Portland Timbers in the fourth round (84th overall).  However he was cut from camp during preseason and on March 26, he signed a professional contract with USL affiliate club Portland Timbers 2.  He made his professional debut on May 19 and assisted on both of T2's goals in their 2–0 victory over PDL club Michigan Bucks in the third round of the 2015 Lamar Hunt U.S. Open Cup.  He made his league debut three days later in a 2–0 defeat to Cascadia rivals Seattle Sounders FC 2.

On January 6, 2020, Casiple moved to USL Championship side Orange County SC.

References

External links
T2 bio
California Golden Bears bio
USSF Development Academy bio

1993 births
Living people
American soccer players
Association football midfielders
Austin Aztex players
California Golden Bears men's soccer players
Orange County SC players
People from Rocklin, California
Portland Timbers draft picks
Portland Timbers 2 players
Reno 1868 FC players
San Jose Earthquakes U23 players
Soccer players from California
Sportspeople from Greater Sacramento
USL League Two players
USL Championship players